Mahmood Hussain may refer to:

 Mahmood Hussain (cricketer) (1932–1991), Pakistani Test cricketer
 Mahmood Hussain (councillor), former Lord Mayor of Birmingham
 Mahmood Hussain (field hockey), Pakistani hockey player